Katathesi Psihis (Greek: Κατάθεση Ψυχής; English: Deposit Soul) is the third studio album by popular Greek singer Nikos Oikonomopoulos, released on 11 December 2009 by Sony BMG Greece. The album contains twelve songs with music by Marios Psimopoulos, Elekos Hristovergis, Panos Falaras while the lyrics are written by the Eleni Giannatsoulia, Spiros Giatras and Maritta Rossi.

Track listing
"Ti Tha Kano Me Sena" (Τι Θα Κάνω Με Σένα; What Am I Going To Do With You) - 4:00
"Htipa" (Χτύπα; Hit) - 4:04
"Tipota Sto Tipota" (Τίποτα Στο Τίποτα; Nothing In Nothing) - 3:57
"Katathesi Psihis" (Κατάθεση Ψυχής; Deposit Soul) - 4:21
"Xekatharisa" (Ξεκαθάρισα; Made It Clear) - 4:47
"Apolito" (Απόλυτο; Absolute) - 5:31
"Mou 'Pe Mia Psihi" (Μου 'Πε Μια Ψυχή; I Told Me A Soul) - 3:46
"Enas Theos Xerei" (Ένας Θεός Ξέρει; Only God Knows) - 3:28
"Htipima Teleiotiko" (Χτύπημα Τελειωτικό; Hitting finisher) - 3:00
"Thelo Na 'Mai" (Θέλω Να 'Μαι; I Want To Be) - 3:42
"To Mavro Hroma" (Το Μαύρο Χρώμα; Black Color) - 3:46
"I Alitheia Na Legetai" (Η Αλήθεια Να Λέγεται; Truth Be Told) - 4:00

Certifications 

After its release, the album achieved platinum certification in Greece.

References

2009 albums
Nikos Oikonomopoulos albums
Greek-language albums
Sony Music Greece albums